Philippe Alexandre (14 March 1932 – 31 October 2022) was a French journalist and writer. He notably worked as a columnist for RTL from 1969 to 1996 and presented several talk shows alongside fellow journalists Serge July and Christine Ockrent.

Biography

Childhood
In his book Ma tribu plus que française, Alexandre recounted the assimilation of his Jewish family and the horrors many of his compatriots faced in World War II.

Career
Alexandre began his career in journalism in 1951 as an editor for the newspaper Combat. From 1969 to 1996, he was a columnist at RTL and spoke humorously on political news each morning for the radio station. He left the station following its merge with the German group Bertelsmann.

On television, he co-hosted the political show Le Débat on TF1 from 1989 to 1992 with Serge July and Michèle Cotta. He then worked as a political columnist for BFM TV, France 3, and numerous magazines.

Death
Philippe Alexandre died in Le Touquet on 31 October 2022, at the age of 90.

Publications
L'Adversaire du Général, Gaston Defferre (1964)
Le Duel De Gaulle-Pompidou (1970)
Chronique des jours moroses 1969-1970 (1971)
La Vie secrète de MONSIEUR LE (1982)
Paysages de campagne (1988)
Plaidoyer impossible pour un vieux président abandonné par les siens (1994)
Nouveaux paysages de campagne (1997)
Les Éléphants malades de la peste (2006)
L'Élysée en péril : les coulisses de Mai 68 (2008)
Dictionnaire amoureux de la politique (2011)
Notre dernier monarque (2016)
Ma tribu plus que française (2017)

References

1932 births
2022 deaths
20th-century French journalists
21st-century French journalists
20th-century French writers
21st-century French writers
Writers from Paris